Zanughan (also Romanized as Zanūghān, Zenowghān, Zanoo Ghan, and Zenughān; also known as Zanāgūn and Zānāqūn) is a village in Kavir Rural District, Deyhuk District, Tabas County, South Khorasan Province, Iran. At the 2006 census, its population was 371, in 121 families.

References 

Populated places in Tabas County